Sean McSherry (born March 7, 1997) is a retired American soccer player who plays as a defender for Atlantic City FC in the NPSL.

Career

College
McSherry played four years of college soccer at Princeton University between 2015 and 2018, making 47 appearances, scoring 7 goals and tallying 9 assists.

New York Red Bulls II
On January 14, 2019, McSherry was drafted 78th overall in the 2019 MLS SuperDraft by New York Red Bulls. On March 8, 2019, McSherry joined USL Championship side New York Red Bulls II.

On December 2, 2019, McSherry announced his retirement from playing professional soccer.

McSherry began playing again with fourth-tier side NPSL side Atlantic City FC.

References

External links
 

1997 births
Living people
American soccer players
Association football defenders
New York Red Bulls draft picks
New York Red Bulls II players
Princeton Tigers men's soccer players
Soccer players from New Jersey
Sportspeople from Monmouth County, New Jersey
USL Championship players